Scopula confinaria is a moth of the family Geometridae. It is found in southern Europe, southern Russia and Turkey.

The larvae feed on Silene and Dianthus species.

Subspecies
Scopula confinaria confinaria
Scopula confinaria aetnaea (Prout, 1935)
Scopula confinaria prouti (Hausmann, 1993)
Scopula confinaria scoblei (Hausmann, 1993)

Scopula sacraria is treated as a subspecies (Scopula confinaria sacraria) by some authors. The same is true for Scopula uberaria (Scopula confinaria uberaria).

References

External links
Lepiforum.de

Moths of Europe
Moths of Asia
Moths described in 1847
confinaria
Taxa named by Gottlieb August Wilhelm Herrich-Schäffer